Pyruconus is a subgenus of sea snails, marine gastropod mollusks in the genus Conus, family Conidae, the cone snails and their allies.

In the latest classification of the family Conidae by Puillandre N., Duda T.F., Meyer C., Olivera B.M. & Bouchet P. (2015), Pyruconus has become a subgenus of Conus as Conus (Pyruconus)Olsson, 1967  (type species: Conus patricius Hinds, 1843) represented as Conus Linnaeus, 1758

Species
 Pyruconus fergusoni (G.B. Sowerby II, 1873) represented as Conus fergusoni G. B. Sowerby II, 1873 (alternate representation)
 Pyruconus patricius (Hinds, 1843) represented as Conus patricius Hinds, 1843 (alternate representation)

References

 Tucker J.K. & Tenorio M.J. (2009) Systematic classification of Recent and fossil conoidean gastropods. Hackenheim: Conchbooks. 296 pp.

External links
 To World Register of Marine Species

Conidae
Gastropod subgenera